Nowoszyce may refer to the following places in Poland:
Nowoszyce, Oleśnica County in Gmina Oleśnica, Oleśnica County in Lower Silesian Voivodeship (SW Poland)
Nowoszyce, Zgorzelec County in Gmina Sulików, Zgorzelec County in Lower Silesian Voivodeship (SW Poland)